Kolkewadi Dam or Kolkiwadi Dam is a dam located in the Konkani region, Ratnagiri district of Maharashtra, India. It is located in Kolkiwadi, about  near the village of Alore, near Chiplun.

Description

The dam is part of the Koyna Hydroelectric Project. It contributes in the 3rd stage of power generation of the Koyna Hydroelectric Project. The electricity is generated in the underground power station located at the base of the dam. The project is run by the Maharashtra State Electricity Board, also known as the MSEB. The area behind the dam is one of the most sparsely populated areas in the state.

The spillway of the dam is located at the center. It has 3 radial gates.

See also
 Konkan division
 Vashishti River
 Western Ghats

References

External links

Dams in Ratnagiri district
Underground power stations
Dams completed in 1975
Gravity dams
1975 establishments in Maharashtra